Windeby may refer to:

Windeby: a municipality in Schleswig-Holstein, Germany
Windeby I: the name given to a German set of ancient mummified human remains, found in 1952, named after where it was found. 
Windeby II, a second set of remains, found later in 1952 in the same area.